The Best of Julie is an LP album by Julie London, released by Liberty Records under catalog number L-5501 in 1962.

Track listing

References

Julie London albums
1962 greatest hits albums
Liberty Records compilation albums